Conus dominicanus, common name the Antilles cone, is a species of sea snail, a marine gastropod mollusk in the family Conidae, the cone snails, cone shells or cones.

These snails are predatory and venomous. They are capable of "stinging" humans.

Description
The size of the shell varies between 40 mm and 57 mm.
The spire is concavely elevated, tuberculate and closely striate. It is nebulously painted with orange-brown, chestnut or chocolate and white, the latter forming usually an interrupted and irregular central band, besides being miscellaneously disposed on other parts of the surface. It is encircled by close narrow brown lines, which are sometimes slightly raised.

Distribution
This marine species of cone snail occurs in the Caribbean Sea off Grenada; Grenadines.

References

 Petuch E.J. & Drolshagen M. (2011) Compendium of Florida fossil shells, volume 1. Wellington, Florida: MdM Publishing. 412 pp. 
 Puillandre N., Duda T.F., Meyer C., Olivera B.M. & Bouchet P. (2015). One, four or 100 genera? A new classification of the cone snails. Journal of Molluscan Studies. 81: 1-23

External links
 To World Register of Marine Species
 Cone Shells - Knights of the Sea
 

dominicanus
Gastropods described in 1792